The Pureun Arboretum is located at 43 Hang-dong, Guro-gu. It is the first arboretum in Seoul that opened in 2013. 

It focuses on exhibits, experiences and education. There are over 2,100 different kinds of plants and 25 theme parks on 103,000 m2, and education programs are also underway. It includes Herb garden, Rock garden, British garden, French garden and Maze Garden. It opens from 5 a.m. to 10 p.m.

And you can also walk along the Hang-dong Railroad Track near the arboretum. The Pureun Arboretum and Hang-dong Railroad Track is one of the Nine Scenic Views of Guro(구로구경:九老九景).

References

External links
 

Parks in Seoul
Forestry in South Korea
Arboreta in South Korea
Guro District, Seoul
2013 establishments in South Korea